Rispark is a suburb (South) of Johannesburg, South Africa. It is located in Region F of the City of Johannesburg Metropolitan Municipality.

Rispark consists of small holdings. Many of these are used as residential and as business properties. Some properties are situated on the hillside with a lovely view of the hills looking south over the valley toward Klipriver.

The area is attractive with open spaces and is surrounded by veld. Rispark Community Church and a private school is located in the area. It is close to Panorama Flea Market, the Panorama Shopping Complex and the Mulbarton Spar. "The Glen" Shopping Mall is also only a few kilometers from Rispark.

References

Johannesburg Region F